The 24th Golden Globe Awards, honoring the best in film and television for 1966, were held on February 15, 1967.

Winners

Film

Best Film - Drama
 A Man for All Seasons
 Born Free
 The Professionals
 The Sand Pebbles
 Who's Afraid of Virginia Woolf?

Best Film - Comedy or Musical
 The Russians Are Coming, the Russians Are Coming
A Funny Thing Happened on the Way to the Forum
Gambit
Not with My Wife, You Don't!
You're a Big Boy Now

Best Actor - Drama
 Paul Scofield — A Man for All Seasons
Richard Burton — Who's Afraid of Virginia Woolf?
Michael Caine — Alfie
Steve McQueen — The Sand Pebbles
Max von Sydow — Hawaii

Best Actress - Drama
 Anouk Aimée — A Man and a Woman (Un homme et une femme)
Ida Kamińska — The Shop on Main Street (Obchod na korze)
Virginia McKenna — Born Free
Elizabeth Taylor — Who's Afraid of Virginia Woolf?
Natalie Wood — This Property Is Condemned

Best Actor - Comedy or Musical
 Alan Arkin — The Russians Are Coming, the Russians Are Coming
Alan Bates — Georgy Girl
Michael Caine — Gambit
Lionel Jeffries — The Spy with a Cold Nose
Walter Matthau — The Fortune Cookie

Best Actress - Comedy or Musical
 Lynn Redgrave — Georgy Girl
Jane Fonda — Any Wednesday
Elizabeth Hartman — You're a Big Boy Now
Shirley MacLaine — Gambit
Vanessa Redgrave — Morgan!

Best Supporting Actor
 Richard Attenborough — The Sand Pebbles
Mako — The Sand Pebbles
John Saxon — The Appaloosa
George Segal — Who's Afraid of Virginia Woolf?
Robert Shaw — A Man for All Seasons

Best Supporting Actress
 Jocelyne LaGarde — Hawaii
Sandy Dennis — Who's Afraid of Virginia Woolf?
Vivien Merchant — Alfie
Geraldine Page — You're a Big Boy Now
Shelley Winters — Alfie

Best Director
 Fred Zinnemann — A Man for All Seasons
Lewis Gilbert  — Alfie
Claude Lelouch  — A Man and a Woman
Mike Nichols  — Who's Afraid of Virginia Woolf?
Robert Wise  — The Sand Pebbles

Best Screenplay
 A Man for All Seasons — Robert Bolt
Alfie — Bill Naughton
The Russians Are Coming, the Russians Are Coming — William Rose
The Sand Pebbles — Robert Anderson
Who's Afraid of Virginia Woolf? — Ernest Lehman

Best Music, Original Score
 Hawaii — Elmer Bernstein
A Man and a Woman — Francis Lai
Is Paris Burning? (Paris brûle-t-il?) — Maurice Jarre
The Bible: In the Beginning... — Toshiro Mayuzumi
The Sand Pebbles — Jerry Goldsmith

Best Original Song
 "Strangers in the Night" — A Man Could Get Killed
"Un Homme et une Femme (A Man and a Woman)" - A Man and a Woman"Born Free" - Born Free"Alfie" - Alfie"Georgy Girl" - Georgy GirlTelevision

Best TV Show I Spy
 The Fugitive
 The Man from U.N.C.L.E.
 Run for Your Life
 That Girl

Best TV Star - Male Dean Martin — The Dean Martin Show
Bill Cosby — I Spy
Robert Culp — I Spy
Ben Gazzara — Run for Your Life
Christopher George — The Rat Patrol

Best TV Star - Female
 Marlo Thomas — That Girl
Phyllis Diller — The Pruitts of Southampton
Barbara Eden — I Dream of Jeannie
Elizabeth Montgomery — Bewitched
Barbara Stanwyck — The Big Valley

References
IMdb 1967 Golden Globe Awards

024
1966 film awards
1966 television awards
1966 awards in the United States
February 1967 events in the United States